Singin' & Swingin'  is the home video debut of Harry Connick, Jr. from 1990 at the age of 22. The video contains five musicvideos, and three songs performed live at the Dominion Theatre in London, as well as an exclusive interview. The VHS was released simultaneously with his big band album We Are in Love and his instrumental trio album Lofty's Roach Souffle.

Dr. John joins Connick on organ and vocals on "Do You Know What It Means To Miss New Orleans".

Track listing
"Do You Know What It Means to Miss New Orleans?" (Eddie DeLange, Louis Alter)
"Stompin' at the Savoy" (Andy Razaf, Benny Goodman, Chick Webb, Edgar Sampson) (live)
"Where or When" (Richard Rodgers, Lorenz Hart) (live)
"I Could Write a Book" (Rodgers, Hart) (live)
"Don't Get Around Much Anymore" (Duke Ellington, Bob Russell)
"It Had to Be You" (Isham Jones, Gus Kahn)
"One Last Pitch" (Harry Connick Jr., Joe Livingston)
"Recipe For Love" (Connick)

Certifications
RIAA certification: Video longform - Gold (September 26, 1990)

References

External links

Musicbox: "One Last Pitch" at Sony BMG
Musicbox: "Recipe For Love" at Sony BMG 

Harry Connick Jr. video albums
1990 video albums